George Edward Holland Richardson (born 4 December 1891 in Seaham, County Durham) was a professional footballer, who played for Huddersfield Town and Hull City. While at Huddersfield he won the 1921–22 FA Cup and the 1922 FA Charity Shield.

References

 

1891 births
Year of death missing
English footballers
Sportspeople from Seaham
Footballers from County Durham
Association football midfielders
English Football League players
Huddersfield Town A.F.C. players
Hull City A.F.C. players
FA Cup Final players